The Hastings Academy, formerly known as Hillcrest, is a secondary school in Hastings, East Sussex, England. The Hastings Academy opened on 1 September 2011 moving into a new building during February 2013. The school has around 900 students and over 100 staff. The Principal is Mr Simon Addison. It is run by the University of Brighton Academies Trust.

History
Hastings A School was completed in 1953, where it opened as a girls secondary school. At around this time the school campus was made up of B-Block and the sports fields.

With the merger of the boys secondary school located in Priory Road with Hastings Grammar School in 1978, (next to Castledown School), Hillcrest accepted both male and female students. Arthur Trevor Kimber who had been head at Hastings Secondary School for Boys became the new head teacher of Hillcrest and many of his staff team from the boys' school transferred across with him.

In 2007 the school closed its 6th Form. On 21 November 2008 The Hastings Observer reported that "The worst school in Hastings has been dealt a further blow after being told it will be put into special measures by Ofsted".  In 2011 the school was closed down by Ofsted and knocked down by East Sussex County Council.  September 2013 saw the closing of Hillcrest School and the opening of The Hastings Academy.

The Old Hillcrest Campus

The school campus was divided into four blocks: L block, the Sports Centre, A Block and B Block. In addition to the Sports Centre, there is a gymnasium in B Block. There were three tennis courts on site and four playgrounds. There were two fields east of the Language Block. The school owned part of the woodland behind A Block's playground. A multi use games area was opened in 2006.

A Block
Humanities: Geography, History and religious education
Science
Drama
Administration
Caretakers' office

There were huts behind A Block where maths is taught and student services, the health clinic, library and canteen were located there.

B Block
English and media
Maths
Art
IT
PE (gym)
Music
Design technology
Student Services
SENCO Department (also, Remedial Block, also J Block)
Food Technology

The main entrance was there and leads to Kenway Hall.

C Block (also, L Block)
The language college was where French, German and Spanish was taught to the students; Japanese. Other languages were  taught during after school classes.
There was an ICT suite, primarily for the use by Language classes.

Hastings Federation
In 2008, a proposal to create a federation between Filsham Valley, Hillcrest and The Grove secondary schools to improve major aspects of the school was  approved by East Sussex County Council.

Under the federation, led by Sir Dexter Hutt, the school has improved in all areas including attitude towards learning, behaviour both in and out of the classroom, OFSTED inspections and GCSE results with 76% of students achieving 5 A* – C, and at least 93% 5A* – G grades.

The federation continues today in the form of the University of Brighton Academies Trust which includes Hastings Academy and The St Leonards Academy (the result of a merger between Filsham Valley and The Grove).

The Hastings Academy opened on 1 September 2011 and an extensive building programme saw the old buildings occupied during the development and construction of the new buildings. The old school was demolished  and the current buildings have been used since February 2013.

Toilet pass controversy
Hastings Academy has a policy of issuing toilet passes to avoid the abuse of toilet breaks during lesson time.  In September 2018 an 11-year-old girl, who was experiencing her first menstrual bleed was not allowed to use the toilet and sent home with bloody knickers, tights and shorts.  The school wanted a doctor's certificate, at a cost of £15, before they would issue a toilet pass.

References

Buildings and structures in Hastings
Secondary schools in East Sussex
Academies in East Sussex